Ziv Better is an Israeli swimmer.

Better was born in Kibbutz Lehavot HaBashan. During his military service with the Israel Defense Forces (IDF] he served as an officer in Golani Brigade. Better was injured by a mine while attempting to rescue one of his soldiers, Doron Shaziri, while fighting in the Lebanon War. As a result of his injury he was blinded in his left eye and lost approximately 90% of his vision in his right eye. Shortly thereafter, he started swimming and soon reached a competitive level.

By 2004, Better had participated in eight European championships, fout world championships and four Paralympic Games. At the 1992 Summer Paralympics in Barcelona, he won two silver medals and two bronze medals, and in the 1996 Summer Paralympics, he won three bronze medals. He has competed five Summer Paralympics from 1992 to 2008.

Better works as a Systems Analyst, and is married and a father of three.

References

External links
 

Year of birth missing (living people)
Living people
Israeli male swimmers
Paralympic swimmers of Israel
Paralympic silver medalists for Israel
Paralympic bronze medalists for Israel
Swimmers at the 1992 Summer Paralympics
Swimmers at the 1996 Summer Paralympics
Swimmers at the 2000 Summer Paralympics
Swimmers at the 2004 Summer Paralympics
Swimmers at the 2008 Summer Paralympics
Medalists at the 1992 Summer Paralympics
Medalists at the 1996 Summer Paralympics
Paralympic medalists in swimming
S12-classified Paralympic swimmers